Der Oderturm is a 24-storey,  office skyscraper in Frankfurt (Oder), Germany, built between 1968 and 1976 when the city was part of East Germany. It is arguably the tallest office building in Brandenburg, with a mobile telephony mast. Its  roof is  less than that of the Stern-Plaza in Potsdam, built in 1998. The  hall containing Tropical Islands and the  steam generator at Schwarze Pumpe power station are taller structures, though they lack occupied floors.

Background
The tower was designed by a collective under architects Hans Tulke and Paul Teichmann and built in part by Free German Youth (FDJ) work brigades; construction lasted nearly eight years. It was planned as an office building, but when it opened it housed a 274-bed dormitory for workers in the Frankfurt semiconductor plant, as well as a 160-bed Jugendtourist-Hotel, similar to a youth hostel, but geared towards organised meetings such as the Whitsuntide meetings of the FDJ with its Polish counterpart, the ZSMP, of which the 1977 meeting, not long after the opening of the hotel, was the most significant.

After German reunification, the building underwent refurbishing from 1992 to 1994, following the plans of architect Monika Krebs, when it opened as the Oderturm.

See also

Jen-Tower
City-Hochhaus Leipzig
Park Inn Berlin
Fernsehturm
Kulturfinger

References

Further reading
Architekturführer DDR: Bezirk Frankfurt (Oder). First edition, 1984. Ingrid Halbach, Matthias Rambow, Horst Büttner, Peter Rätzel. VEB Verlag für Bauwesen, Berlin.

External links
Turm24 cafe homepage (in German)
Article about the Oderturm (in German)

Buildings and structures in Frankfurt (Oder)
Residential skyscrapers in Germany
Skyscraper hotels in Germany
Office buildings completed in 1976